Letter from an Unknown Woman is a novella by Stefan Zweig. Published in 1922, it tells the story of an author who, while reading a letter written by a woman he does not remember, gets glimpses into her life story.

Plot
A rich and well-known writer (R.), returning home to Vienna from one of many holidays, finds a long letter from an unknown woman (Fräulein). As a teenager the woman had lived with her poor widowed mother in the same building and had fallen totally in love with both the opulent cultured lifestyle of her neighbour and the handsome charming man himself. Her passion for the writer was not lessened by the flow of attractive women spending the night with him, nor when she had to leave Vienna and moved to Innsbruck when her mother remarried. At age 18 she returned to Vienna, took a job and tried to meet the writer again. He did not recognise her and, without revealing her name, she succeeded in spending three nights with him before he disappeared on a long holiday. Pregnant, she lost her job and had to give birth in a refuge for the indigent. Resolved that their child should have a good life, she spent nights with or became mistress of various rich men but would never marry because her heart belonged always to the writer. Out one night with a current lover, she saw the writer in a night club and went home with him instead. To him, she was just an agreeable companion for that night, as he again did not recognise her. In the 1918 flu pandemic, the child died and she, ill herself, wrote the letter to be posted after her death.

Adaptations

Film
Only Yesterday, a 1933 American movie directed by John M. Stahl, was heavily inspired by Zweig's story, while not giving it the credits.

Another unofficial adaptation came out in 1943, the Finnish Valkoiset ruusut (White Roses), starring Helena Kara and Tauno Palo and directed by Hannu Leminen.

In 1948, the first official film version was produced, with a screenplay adaptation by Howard Koch. Starring Joan Fontaine, Louis Jourdan, Mady Christians and Marcel Journet, it was directed by Max Ophüls. In 1992, Letter from an Unknown Woman was selected for preservation in the United States National Film Registry by the Library of Congress as being "culturally, historically, or aesthetically significant".

In 1957, a Mexican version called Feliz Año, Amor Mío, starring Marga López and Arturo de Córdova, was released.

In 1962, an Egyptian adaptation, Ressalah min emraa maghoula, was released. It was directed by Salah Abu Seif and starred Farid al-Atrash and Lobna Abdel Aziz.

In 2001, the TV film Lettre d'une inconnue by French director Jacques Deray became the last production of this artist.

In 2004, a Chinese adaptation of the novella was made. It was directed by Xu Jinglei.

In 2011, Mongolian film director Naranbaatar made a film adaptation of the novella.

Opera
In 1975, the mono-opera Письмо незнакомки (Letter from an Unknown Woman) was composed by Antonio Spadavecchia (Антонио Спадавеккиа), and staged in the Soviet Union (and later in Russia) in Russian.

Music
In December 2017, Canadian/Russian composer Airat Ichmouratov composed Octet in G minor, Op. 56, which was inspired by Stefan Zweig's novella "Letter from an Unknown Woman". It was commissioned and premiered by Saguenay and Lafayette String Quartets on 13 January 2018 at Fanny Bay Hall, Fanny Bay, British Columbia, Canada. In November 2018, the composer made an arrangement of the Octet for String Orchestra; this was recorded by the Belarusian State Chamber Orchestra, with Evgeny Bushkov as conductor, and was released by Chandos Records.

References

1922 German-language novels
Austrian novels
Austrian novellas
Novels about writers
Novels adapted into operas
Austrian novels adapted into television shows
Novellas by Stefan Zweig
Austrian novels adapted into films